Maomao may refer to:

Fish species

 Blue maomao, Scorpis violacea.
 Green damselfish, Abudefduf abdominalis.
 Pink maomao, Caprodon longimanus.

People
 Deng Rong's penname, under which she wrote the biography of her father Deng Xiaoping.

Other uses
 A colloquial term in Mandarin Chinese for the giant panda.